The California Energy Code (also titled Building Energy Efficiency Standards for Residential and Nonresidential Buildings), called simply Title 24 in industry, is the sixth section of the California Building Standards Code. The code was created by the California Building Standards Commission in 1978 in response to a legislative mandate to reduce California's energy consumption. These standards are updated periodically by the California Energy Commission. The code includes energy conservation standards applicable to most buildings throughout California.

A 2020 study found that the 1978 energy code successfully reduced energy consumption, and that the implementation of the policy passed a cost-benefit test.

History 
California was the first state to implement minimum energy efficiency standards in 1974. It was the first to establish an energy regulation commission – the California Energy Commission. These regulations and codes have been in effect since 1974. California has the lowest per capita energy consumption in the US.

Purpose 
The code's purpose is to advance the state's energy policy, develop renewable energy sources and prepare for energy emergencies. The codes are divided into residential and non-residential sections.

Structure  
The three general parts, which include all the responsibilities and criteria of the standards, are:
 Mandatory Requirements
 Performance Standards
 Prescriptive Standards

All buildings must follow the mandatory requirements. Performance standards vary by the building location and type.

These parts are designed to accomplish the following:
 Forecast future energy need
 Support energy and technology research
 Develop renewable energy resources
 Develop renewable transportation fuels and technologies

Climate zones 

Standards vary based on climate zone. California is divided into 16 zones:
 Arcata
 Santa Rosa
 Oakland
 San Jose
 Santa Maria
 Torrance
 San Diego
 Fullerton
 Burbank
 Riverside
 Red Bluff
 Sacramento
 Fresno
 Palmdale
 Palm Springs
 Blue Canyon

2019 Code 
The 2019 California Energy Code became effective on January 1, 2020. It focuses on such areas such as residential photovoltaic systems, thermal envelope standards and non-residential lighting requirements.

Homes built under this code are about 53% more energy efficient than those built to comply with the 2016 Energy Code. This code provides a market for "smart" technologies.

The 2019 Code added photovoltaic system requirements for low-rise residential buildings. Exceptions grant a reduction in size for photovoltaic systems.

The 2019 Code has simpler non-residential forms and reduces their number from 47 forms to 10. Each building component has one form per category:
 Electric Power Distribution
 Outdoor Lighting
 Indoor Lighting
 Sign Lighting
 Solar Ready
 Commissioning
 Thermal Envelope
 Covered Processes
 Mechanical
 Water Heating

See also 
 Energy law
 Global Warming Solutions Act of 2006
 Green Building Initiative
 Greenhouse gas emissions
 Indoor air quality

References

External links 
 

Energy Code
Energy in California
Energy in the United States
Environmental law in the United States
United States energy law